Columbia is an unincorporated community in Williams County, in the U.S. state of Ohio.

History
Columbia was founded in 1854.

The village was the terminus of the St Joseph Valley Railway from 1915 to 1918, running from Angola, Indiana. This was a failed interurban electric railroad project attempting to create a passenger service between Chicago and Toledo, but which was never electrified.

References

Unincorporated communities in Williams County, Ohio
Unincorporated communities in Ohio